Alvils Gulbis (17 April 1936 – 27 February 2021) was a Latvian basketball player.

He played for Rīgas ASK winning 3 Euroleague titles (1958, 1959, 1960) and 3 Soviet national championships (1955, 1957, 1958). In 1964 he joined VEF Rīga where he spent five seasons as a player and later on five more seasons as head coach.

His grandson Ernests is a professional tennis player.

References

External links 
biography at Rīgas ASK homepage (Latvian)
basketpedya.com

1936 births
2021 deaths
ASK Riga players
Latvian men's basketball players
Soviet men's basketball players
Latvian basketball coaches
Latvian sports coaches